is a Japanese footballer who plays for MIO Biwako Shiga.

Career
After playing for Chukyo University's football team, Sakamoto signed for his hometown club Roasso Kumamoto ahead of the 2018 season.

Sakamoto joined JFL club Suzuka Point Getters in 19 January 2021.

On 11 January 2023, Sakamoto was announced as a new signing of MIO Biwako Shiga, which had signed three other teammates from Suzuka for the 2023 season.

Career statistics

Club 

Updated to the start from 2023 season.

References

External links

Profile at J. League
Profile at Roasso Kumamoto

1995 births
Living people
Ryutsu Keizai University alumni
Association football people from Kumamoto Prefecture
Japanese footballers
J2 League players
J3 League players
Japan Football League players
Roasso Kumamoto players
Suzuka Point Getters players
MIO Biwako Shiga players
Association football midfielders